Pouteria chocoensis is a species of plant in the family Sapotaceae. It is endemic to Colombia.

References

chocoensis
Endemic flora of Colombia
Data deficient plants
Taxonomy articles created by Polbot
Taxa named by André Aubréville